= Monastery of Santa Catalina de Montefaro =

Spanish Monastery

Coordinates: 43°27′02″N 8°16′55″W

- Mosteiro de Santa Catalina de Montefaro
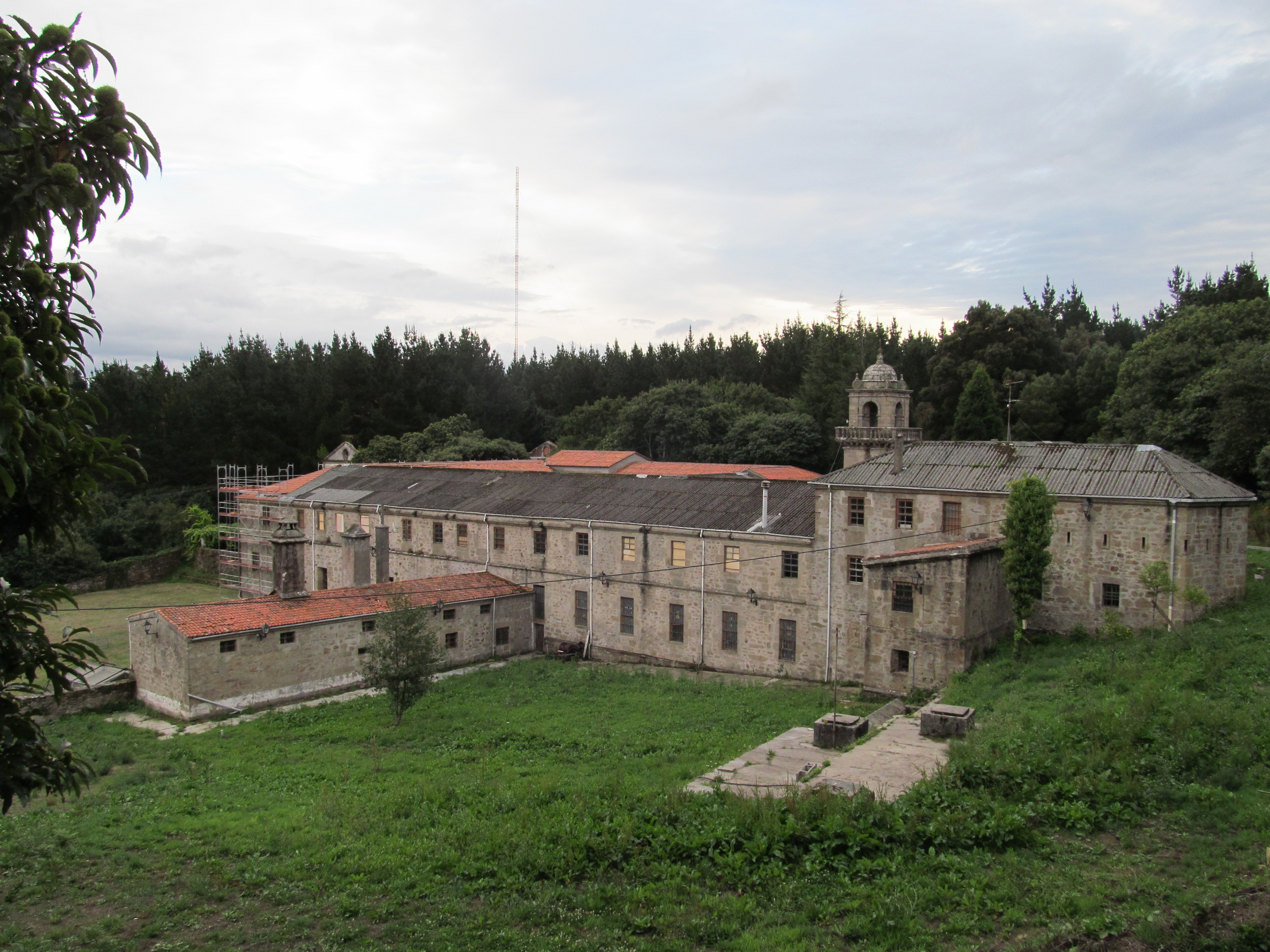
- View of the monastery in 2017.

Location
- Location: Ares, Galicia, Spain
- Interactive map of Monastery of Santa Catalina de Montefaro

Monasterio de Santa Catalina de Montefaro is a monastery in Galicia, Spain.
